This page shows the results of the Judo Competition for men and women at the 1995 Pan American Games, held from March 11 to March 26 in Mar del Plata, Argentina. There were eight weight divisions.

Medal table

Men's competition

Men's Flyweight (-56 kg)

Men's Bantamweight (-60 kg)

Men's Featherweight (-65 kg)

Men's Lightweight (-71 kg)

Men's Light Middleweight (-78 kg)

Men's Middleweight (-86 kg)

Men's Light Heavyweight (-95 kg)

Men's Heavyweight (+95 kg)

Women's competition

Women's Flyweight (-45 kg)

Women's Extra Lightweight (-48 kg)

Women's Half Lightweight (-52 kg)

Women's Lightweight (-56 kg)

Women's Half Middleweight (-61 kg)

Women's Middleweight (-66 kg)

Women's Half Heavyweight (-72 kg)

Women's Heavyweight (+72 kg)

References

External links
 
 Sports 123

American Games
1995
Judo competitions in Argentina
Events at the 1995 Pan American Games
International judo competitions hosted by Argentina